Eduardo Osta Valenti (born 4 September 1959) is a former professional tennis player from Catalonia, Spain.

Playing career
Osta took part in the men's singles draw at the 1982 French Open. He was defeated in the first round by fourth seed José Luis Clerc. The Spaniard also appeared in the 1988 French Open, as a qualifier, but again lost in the opening round, to Francisco Yunis in four sets.

Coaching
During the early 1990s he coached both Arantxa Sánchez Vicario and Conchita Martínez.

Challenger titles

Singles: (1)

References

1959 births
Living people
Spanish male tennis players
Spanish tennis coaches
Tennis players from Barcelona